Albolagh (also Romanized as Ālbolāgh and Āl Bolāgh) is a village in Behi-e Feyzolah Beygi Rural District, in the Central District of Bukan County, West Azerbaijan Province, Iran. At the 2006 census, its population was 470, in 88 families.

References 

Populated places in Bukan County